Robert Adolf Naef (22 July 1907 – 13 March 1975) was a Swiss astronomer. A banker by profession, in his spare time, for 50 years he worked at the Urania Observatory in Zurich. In 1941 he created the nautical almanac Der Sternenhimmel.

Legacy
1906 Naef, a stony asteroid named after Naef
Observatory Naef Épendes at Épendes, Switzerland, named after Naef

References

1907 births
1975 deaths
20th-century Swiss astronomers
Swiss bankers